Bustanil Arifin (10 October 1925 – 13 February 2011) was an Indonesian politician. He once held the posts of Head of the Logistics Department and Minister of Cooperation in Indonesia. He was married to R.A. Suhardani.

External links
Bustanil Arifin's page in TokohIndonesia.com

1925 births
2011 deaths
Indonesian military personnel
Indonesian politicians
Place of birth missing